Fon Wireless Ltd. is a  for-profit company  incorporated and registered in the United Kingdom that provides wireless services. Fon was founded in Madrid, Spain, in 2006, by Martín Varsavsky where it headquarters most of its operations.

Fon started out by building its Wi-Fi network through devices called "foneras". Members, whom the company called "Foneros", agreed to share a part of their bandwidth as a Wi-Fi signal, so that they could connect to other members' hotspots.

As the company evolved, it shifted its focus to working with mobile operators and telecommunication providers, and expanded from deploying residential Wi-Fi to providing access and technology to carriers and service providers. Fon claims to operate a network of over 20,000,000 WiFi hotspots.

Company 

Fon has subsidiaries and branch offices in the United States, UK, Brazil, France, Germany and Japan. Its investors include Atomico Ventures, Google, Index Ventures, Sequoia Capital and Skype.

Early years 

The original idea of Fon was to create a network for Wi-Fi access wherever customers went. To become a Fon member, users had to buy a special router called a “Fonera”. With this router, they agreed to share a part of their bandwidth as a second Wi-Fi signal, in exchange for the right to use other members' Fon hotspots. To achieve this, Fon operated a system of dual access wireless networks. In 2007, Fon’s development model shifted to encompass ISPs and it began to work on creating Wifi community networks with British Telecom (BT) and SFR. In November 2007, Fon deployed its first wifi rollout, and continued using this foundation with more telco partners in the years to come.

Middle years 

Since its initial involvement with ISPs, Fon continued to expand its network through partnerships with local Internet service providers in countries such as Germany, Greece, Japan, and Brazil among others. At the same time the company has continued to expand its product portfolio as technology developed.

2016

In 2016 the company evolved to include premium networks such as airports, hotels, convention centers, public spaces, etc. in addition to residential networks. Fon also has a technology portfolio called to allow service providers to deliver services to their own customers.

Hardware and firmware 

Originally Fon began with a software download for compatible routers, in particular, Linksys routers. This is custom firmware based on OpenWrt.

Fon started using the OpenWrt base as firmware base for Fon branded routers. The firmware has been customised specifically for use in the Fon Community, allowing consumers to share their broadband connection and to connect to other Fon Spots around the world.

Fon firmware creates two different Wi-Fi signals: one private and one public.
 Private ('MYPLACE') : encrypted and intended for the owner's private use. Only the Fon Spot owner can access the internal network, computers and files.
 Public ('FON_FREE_INTERNET'): un-encrypted or open, but username and password protected so allowing only registered Fon users to access the Fon Wi-Fi community network, but they cannot access the consumer's private network.

The new 2014 Fonera SIMPL, introduced in February 2014, includes Facebook integration. The owner of the Fonera SIMPL may register their own Facebook account with the device. Once this is done, any user that is a 'Facebook Friend' of the owner is granted access to that Fonera (only).

The 'Fonera Business' takes Facebook integration further by offering free WiFi to customers of a business who are asked to 'Like' the Facebook page for the business in order to gain free WiFi access.

In early 2018, the Online-Shop closed: "manufacture and sale of Foneras has been discontinued".

Partnerships and collaborations 
Fon claims to have the largest Wi-Fi network in the world, with over 20 million hotspots as at June 2016.

BT (UK) 

BT Group (formerly known as British Telecom) and Fon formed a partnership on 4 October 2007. They jointly created the BT-Fon Community by flashing Fon's software on all BT Total Broadband WiFi routers in the UK. This allowed BT Total Broadband customers to participate in the Fon community without buying a Fonera router and in some cases without sharing their own WiFi.

In June 2020 Fon's access to the BT WiFi network ended. No notification was given by either Fon nor BT (other than BT mentioning beforehand, the SSID "BT WiFi with Fon" would be changing to "BTwifi", but without informing the date of the change not that it would end access). On the day of the change all access points from BT disappeared from the map on the Fon app.

SFR (France) 

In 2007 Fon and SFR launched Fon on WiFi routers throughout France. SFR subscribers can opt into Fon to share and receive WiFi services.

NOS (Portugal) 

The partnership ended in March 2020.
In 2008, ZON (now NOS) announced a partnership with Fon to create the largest WiFi network in Portugal.  Fon technology is built into NOS WiFi routers so its subscribers become part of the Fon community automatically.

In March 11th 2020, the partnership between NOS and Fon ended. NOS discontinued the Fon service and changed the existing Fon hotspots (integrated into some of NOS WiFi routers) to its own Wifi sharing initiative NOS_Wi-Fi_Hotspots, usage of this service was only available to NOS costumers. In August 13th 2021, NOS discontinued the NOS_Wifi service stating it wasn't possible to continue to offer the service, given that the new generation of Routers can't support the functionality.

SoftBank (Japan) 

SoftBank is Fon's first collaboration with a mobile line operator wanting to offload data traffic to WiFi. Since 2010, SoftBank bundles a Fonera with every iPhone they sell.

Oi (Brazil) 
On 31 October 2011 Oi announced its partnership with Fon, granting global WiFi access to its broadband customers.

Proximus (Belgium) 
Discontinued; From November 2011 through 2018, Belgacom (now Proximus) was part the Fon network. Proximus added Fon's WiFi-sharing technology to its BBox2 modem earlier in 2011, making it possible to broadcast two WiFi signals from a broadband internet source. Fon Membership was automatically activated (opt-out).

Netia (Poland) 
Discontinued; From 28 February 2012 through 2018 Fon was added Poland to its network, deploying over 100,000 hotspots in the first few months.

KPN (the Netherlands) 
Discontinued; KPN, a large telecommunications company in the Netherlands, and Fon formed a partnership to publicly launch the Fon network on KPN modems. As of 1 August 2020 this partnership is discontinued.

Deutsche Telekom (Germany) 

In March 2013, a partnership with Deutsche Telekom in Germany was announced. This has not been actively  marketed since 2020. The partnership is expected to be discontinued in 2021.

Four other Telekom branches have joined the Fon network:

HT (Croatia) 

In Spring 2013, HT and Fon announced the addition of their new partnership in Croatia.

Cosmote (Greece) 

In February 2014, Cosmote (then OTE), became the second DT company to join the Fon network.

Telekom Romania (Romania) 

2 July 2014 marked Fon’s expansion into Romania with another DT company, Telekom Romania.

Magyar Telekom (Hungary) 

On 5 April 2016 Hungary became the 17th country to join the Fon network, and the 5th DT subsidiary to become a partner. On the 1st of September 2020, Telekom discontinued the service in Hungary.

MWEB ADSL (South Africa) 

In February 2014, MWEB joined the Fon network. MWEB customers that have a Fon enabled router can share their WiFi Bandwidth and also use those of other Fon users in the countries and locations that Fon have partners.

Telstra (Australia) 

On 20 May 2014 Telstra announced its collaboration with Fon. On 30 June 2015 Telstra Air was launched, granting home broadband users access to the Fon network.

Vodafone (Spain) 
On 22 April 2015 Vodafone Spain entered into a partnership with Fon at the same time Vodafone Italy announced their collaboration.

Vodafone (Italy) 
On 22 April 2015 Vodafone Italy entered into a partnership with Fon at the same time Vodafone Spain announced their collaboration.

Awards and recognition 
 2008: Awarded “Most Innovative Wireless Broadband Company” for its partnership with BT at the Wireless Broadband Innovation Awards 2008.
 2013: “Best Next Generation Wi-Fi Device/ Application Award” at the Wireless Broadband Alliance (WBA)’s WiFi Industry Awards 2013 for the new “Fonera: a social WiFi router”.
 2014: “Best WiFi Innovation Service” at the Wireless Broadband Alliance (WBA)’s WiFi Industry Awards 2014 for the Gramofon.
 2014: First European operator to be certified with as a “Premier” participant, the highest level of the Wireless Broadband Alliance’s Interoperability Compliance Program (ICP).

See also 
 Express Wi-Fi
 Guifi.net
 Meraki
Eduroam, a similar partnership between universities around the world. Eduroam allows students and staff from participating institutions to connect to hotspots at other participating colleges and universities.

References

External links 

 

Wi-Fi providers
Telecommunications companies of Spain
Custom firmware